The David T. and Nan Wood Honeyman House is a house located in southwest Portland, Oregon, listed on the National Register of Historic Places.

See also
 Nan Wood Honeyman
 National Register of Historic Places listings in Southwest Portland, Oregon

References

1908 establishments in Oregon
Colonial Revival architecture in Oregon
Houses completed in 1908
Houses on the National Register of Historic Places in Portland, Oregon
Portland Historic Landmarks
Southwest Portland, Oregon